Miranda Xafa is a Greek economist, formerly Greece's representative at the IMF Executive Board and chief economic adviser to the Prime Minister of Greece, and currently CEO of an Athens-based advisory firm. She is also a senior fellow at the Centre for International Governance Innovation.

Education
After graduating from the American College of Greece in 1974, she enrolled in the University of Pennsylvania where she received a Master's and a Ph.D. in Economics.

Career
Xafa started working for the International Monetary Fund in Washington in 1980, where she focused on economic stabilization programs in Latin America. Following the center-right New Democracy party win in the 1990 general elections in Greece, Xafa was appointed in 1991 chief economic advisor to prime minister Konstantinos Mitsotakis.

Following the party's defeat in the 1993 legislative elections, Xafa worked as a financial-market analyst at Salomon Brothers/Citigroup in London, UK. In the period 2004–09, she served as a member of the board of the IMF in Washington D.C., representing countries such as Italy, Greece, and Portugal, and subsequently worked as senior investment strategist and member of the advisory board of I.J. Partners in Geneva, Switzerland.

She is currently CEO of an Athens-based advisory firm, and a senior fellow at the Centre for International Governance Innovation.

Academia
Xafa has taught Economics at the University of Pennsylvania and at Princeton University. She has authored articles on international finance, the Latin American debt crisis, European monetary unification.  and sovereign debt restructuring. She is currently a senior scholar at the Center for International Governance Innovation, where she focuses on the Eurozone economy.

Views
Xafa supports the austerity measures undertaken by various governments in Greece and the reform and financial assistance program agreed between Greece and the troika. She is a supply sider.

She has publicly denounced the "magician's tricks" that ostensibly "beautified" Greece's state finances and economic ratios at the time of the country joining the Eurozone, as well as any attempt at Grexit. She has called on Greek governments to close down the Greek state's defense manufacturing industries because "they are operating at a financial loss." In the 2010s, she joined the "free market", "pro-business" Drassi ("Action") party, serving on its executive committee.

Selected works

«Lessons from the 2012 Greek Debt Restructuring», CIGI Paper No 32, June 201 
«EU Bank Resolution Post-Cyprus», Cayman Financial Review, July 12, 2013. Available at https://www.mirandaxafa.com/mediaupload/pdf/eu_bank_resolution_post_cyprus.pdf
«The IMF’s Lending Framework and Sovereign Debt Restructuring», CIGI Commentary, July 2014 https://www.cigionline.org/publications/imfs-lending-framework-and-sovereign-debt-restructuring/
«European Banking Union, Three Years on», CIGI Paper No 73, June 2015 https://www.cigionline.org/publications/european-banking-union-three-years
«European Banking Supervision: The First 18 Months», in D. Schoenmaker and N. Veron, editors, Bruegel blueprint, June 2016 http://bruegel.org/2016/06/blueprint-european-banking-supervision-the-first-eighteen-months/
«Playing with Matches in the Ammunition Warehouse» CIGI Policy Brief No 100, March 2017 https://www.cigionline.org/publications/greece-playing-matches-ammunition-warehouse
«European Capital Markets Union after Brexit» CIGI Paper No 140, August 2017 https://www.cigionline.org/publications/european-capital-markets-union-post-brexi t
«Greece’s “Clean Exit” from Third Bailout: A Reality Check» CIGI Policy Brief No 124, March 2018 https://www.cigionline.org/publications/greeces-clean-exit-third-bailout-reality-check
«Euro area governance reform: The Unfinished Agenda» CIGI Paper No 203, November 2018 https://www.cigionline.org/publications/euro-area-governance-reform-unfinished-agenda
«A Statistician’s Ordeal: The Case of Andreas Georgiou» World Economics, Vol. 20, No 3, July–September 2019 https://www.worldeconomics.com/Andreas-Georgiou
Robert Mundell, 1932-2021: Ahead of his Time” Johns Hopkins Institute for Applied Economics, April 2021 https://sites.krieger.jhu.edu/iae/files/2021/04/Robert-Mundell-1932-2021-Ahead-of-his-Time.pdf

See also
Yanis Varoufakis

References

External links
Article IV Consultation—Staff Report: Statement by the Executive Director for Greece, IMF, January 2006

Living people
Greek bankers
20th-century Greek economists
Writers from Athens
Greek women economists
Year of birth missing (living people)
21st-century Greek economists